Piccinini is an Italian surname. Notable people with the surname include:

 Alberto Piccinini (footballer) (1923−1972), Italian professional football player
 Alessandro Piccinini (1566 – c. 1638), Italian lutenist and composer
 Amelia Piccinini (1917–1979), Italian athlete
 Eduardo Piccinini (born 1968), Brazilian butterfly swimmer
 Francesca Piccinini (born 1979), Italian volleyball player
 Gaetano Piccinini (1904–1972), Italian priest of the Don Orione Congregation
 Gualtiero Piccinini (born 1970), Italian and American philosopher
 Marco Piccinini (born 1952), Monegasque personality, businessman and politician
 Marina Piccinini (born 1968), Italian American virtuoso flautist
 Patricia Piccinini (born 1965), Australian artist

See also
 Joe Piccininni (1922–1995), Canadian city councillor

Italian-language surnames